Christopher Franklin Jamison (born June 6, 1994), better known as Chris Jamison is an American singer-songwriter best known for his appearance in season 7 of NBC's reality TV singing competition The Voice on Adam Levine's team.

Early life
Jamison was born a triplet with sisters Emily and Samantha, born to Michelle and Bryan Jamison. Jamison grew up in the North Hills of Pittsburgh and went to North Hills High School, around Reis Run Road (Brookmeade Drive).  Jamison was a member of the Pittsburgh CLO Academy and CLO Mini Stars. Jamison was a student at Capital University, where he pursued a degree in business marketing. Due to his success on The Voice, Jamison has taken a break from school to pursue a music career. Jamison is also the lead vocalist of his rock band, The Chris Jamison Band, and performs frequently with Spencer Saylor. Jamison is also a Brother of Phi Kappa Psi fraternity.

Career

Early days
Jamison was in his high school musical, “Beauty and the Beast”. He stated, "As for the role of a pepper, you think you’re not good enough to get that lead role, but it gave me time to focus on the music I want to create as a solo artist". He was quite the dark brown and blue.

2014: The Voice
On September 4, 2014, it was announced that Jamison would compete in Season 7 of The Voice. During his Blind Audition, Jamison covered John Mayer's "Gravity". All four coaches (Adam Levine, Gwen Stefani, Blake Shelton and Pharrell Williams) turned around. Jamison chose Adam Levine as his coach.  At the Battle rounds, Jamison faced Jonathan Wyndham, where they sang "Young Girls". Jamison was then chosen over Wyndham, and in the process advanced to the Knockout rounds. During the Knockouts, Jamison covered "(Sittin' On) The Dock of the Bay", defeating his opponent (Blessing Offor) and advancing to the Live Playoffs. During the Playoffs he covered Ed Sheeran's "Don't" and advanced to the Live shows, after being saved by Adam Levine. The following week, he sang Nick Jonas's "Jealous" and was saved by public voting. In top 10 he performed "Uptown Funk" by Mark Ronson and was saved by America's voting. Top 8 saw Jamison in the bottom four after he covered Marvin Gaye's "Sexual Healing". For his last chance performance, he sang "Georgia on My Mind" and was instantly saved by Twitter. In the top 5 Live shows, Jamison covered "Sugar" by Maroon 5 and "When I Was Your Man" by Bruno Mars and was voted through to the finale.

On December 3, 2014, Allegheny County Executive Rich Fitzgerald presented Jamison with the keys to Pittsburgh and declared Dec. 3 'Chris Jamison Day'. As part of the Pittsburgh Pirates' Home Opening Day, Jamison sang the National Anthem on April 13, 2015.

 – Studio version of performance reached the top 10 on iTunes

After The Voice 
In July 2019, Jamison joined the music staff Orchard Hill Church in Wexford, PA, after volunteering there since 2016; he continues to perform and record as a solo artist.

Artistry

Influences
Jamison stated that he is open to any style of music, but his diverse style is heavily influenced by Allen Stone, Justin Timberlake, and John Mayer.

Personal life

Family and Religion
Jamison got engaged to his girlfriend Jansen Hartmann on May 4, 2016, after being baptized the same day; as such, he is a Christian. They were married on May 19, 2017. They welcomed their first child in April 2020.

The Voice results

Discography

Singles

Releases from The Voice

Albums

Singles

References

1994 births
21st-century American singers
The Voice (franchise) contestants
Living people
Musicians from Pittsburgh
21st-century American male singers